Remember Me: Essential, Vol. 1 is a remix album and greatest hits album by American singer and drag queen RuPaul, released on February 3, 2017. It features remixed versions of some of his older songs as well as new ones that were recorded for previous albums but never released.

Background and composition
When asked whether Remember Me is a remix album or a greatest hits compilation, RuPaul said, "It's all of the above. These are songs that I've revisited from my early career, and re-imagined them and re-performed them. Yeah, that's really what it is. I don't know if there's even a genre for that, but it is everything you said and more”.

The album features remixes of songs originally produced between 1993 and 2007 (from Supermodel of the World through the Starrbooty soundtrack), including some previously unreleased material. "Mighty Love" was written and recorded as a demo, but never released, while "Rock It (To the Moon)" reworks a song from Starrbooty.

Promotion
"Rock It (To the Moon)" was  featured in promotional material for the ninth season of RuPaul's Drag Race. The remix  of "Snapshot" was paired with a compilation of Ru's runway looks for a music video released February 16, 2017 by World of Wonder.

Track listing

Chart performance

References

2017 albums
RuPaul albums